Events in the year 1859 in Norway.

Incumbents
Monarch: Oscar I (until 8 July); then Charles IV

Events

8 July – Charles XV succeeds his father Oscar I of Sweden and Norway (as Charles IV)

Arts and literature

Notable births

 

28 January – Ambrosia Tønnesen, sculptor (died 1948).
5 April – Harald Smedal, politician and Minister (died 1911)
15 May – Olav Bjørkum, politician (died 1936)
23 June – Daniel Isaachsen, physicist (died 1940)
29 June – Ragnvald Bødtker, engineer (died 1946)
30 July – Christian Sparre, politician (died 1940)
4 August – Knut Hamsun, author, Nobel Prize in Literature laureate (died 1952)
29 August – Thomas Vigner Christiansen Haaland, politician (died 1913)
7 October – Thorleif Frederik Schjelderup, businessperson (died 1931)
11 November – Belle Gunness, serial killer
15 November – Bjørn Bjørnson, actor and theatre director (died 1942)
15 November – Christopher Hornsrud, politician and Prime Minister of Norway (died 1960)
17 November – Fredrik Stang Lund, politician and Minister (died 1922)
23 December – Sigurd Ibsen, author and politician (died 1930)
27 December – Bernt Holtsmark, politician (died 1941)
27 December – Minda Ramm, novelist, translator and literary critic (died 1924).

Notable deaths

14 February – Ole Rasmussen Apeness, district sheriff, soldier, and farmer (b. 1765)
26 May – Engebret Soot, canal engineer (born 1786)
7 June – Lauritz Dorenfeldt Jenssen, businessperson (born 1801)
27 August – Catharine Hermine Kølle, adventurer and painter (born 1788)
29 October – Nils Landmark, jurist, farmer and politician (born 1775)
19 December – Niels Arntzen Sem, politician (born 1782)
23 December – Even Hammer Holmboe, politician (born 1792)

Full date unknown
Michael Sevald Aamodt, politician (born 1784)

See also

References